Airport station or Airport Station may refer to:

Asia

China 
Changchun Longjia railway station, a railway station serving Changchun Longjia International Airport
Changsha Huanghua Airport station, a maglev station serving Changsha Huanghua International Airport
Chongqing Terminal 2 of Jiangbei Airport station, a rapid transit station serving Chongqing Jiangbei International Airport Terminal 2
Chongqing Terminal 3 of Jiangbei Airport station, a rapid transit station serving Chongqing Jiangbei International Airport Terminal 3
Dalian Airport staton (Dalian Metro), a rapid transit station serving Dalian Zhoushuizi International Airport
Guiyang Longdongbao railway station, a high-speed rail station serving Guiyang Longdongbao International Airport
Haikou Meilan railway station, a high-speed rail station serving Haikou Meilan International Airport
Hangzhou Xiaoshan International Airport station, a rapid transit station serving Hangzhou Xiaoshan International Airport
Hohhot Bayan (Airport) station, a rapid transit station serving Hohhot Baita International Airport
Hong Kong Airport station (MTR), a rapid transit station serving Hong Kong International Airport
Jieyang Jieyang Airport railway station, a railway station serving Jieyang Chaoshan International Airport
Kunming Kunming Airport station, a rapid transit station serving Kunming Changshui International Airport
Lanzhou Zhongchuan Airport railway station, a railway station serving Lanzhou Zhongchuan International Airport
Nanjing Lukou International Airport station, a rapid transit station serving Nanjing Lukou International Airport
Ningbo Lishe International Airport Station, a rapid transit station serving Ningbo Lishe International Airport
Qingdao Jiaodong International Airport station, a rapid transit station serving Qingdao Jiaodong International Airport
Qingdao Qingdao Airport railway station, a high-speed rail station serving Qingdao Jiaodong International Airport
Sanya Sanya Phoenix Airport railway station, a high-speed rail station serving Sanya Phoenix International Airport
Shenyang Taoxian Airport station, a tram stop serving Shenyang Taoxian International Airport
Shenzhen Airport station (Shenzhen Metro), a rapid transit station serving Terminal 3 of Shenzhen Bao'an International Airport
Shenzhen Shenzhen Airport Railway Station, a railway station serving Shenzhen Bao'an International Airport
Shijiazhuang Zhengding Airport railway station, a high-speed rail station serving Shijiazhuang Zhengding International Airport
Tianjin Binhaiguojijichang station, a rapid transit station serving Tianjin Binhai International Airport
Turpan Turpan North railway station, a high-speed rail station near Turpan Jiaohe Airport
Ürümqi International Airport station, a rapid transit station serving Ürümqi Diwopu International Airport
Wenzhou Airport station (Wenzhou Metro), a rapid transit station serving Wenzhou Longwan International Airport
Wuhan Tianhe International Airport station, a rapid transit station serving Wuhan Tianhe International Airport
Wuhan Tianhe Airport railway station, a railway station serving Wuhan Tianhe International Airport
Wuxi Sunan Shuofang International Airport station, a rapid transit station serving Sunan Shuofang International Airport
Xi'an Airport West (T1, T2, T3) station, a railway station serving Xi'an Xianyang International Airport
Xuzhou Guanyin Airport station, a high-speed rail station serving Xuzhou Guanyin International Airport
Yinchuan Hedong Airport railway station, a high-speed rail station serving Yinchuan Hedong International Airport
Zhengzhou Xinzheng International Airport station, a rapid transit station serving Zhengzhou Xinzheng International Airport
Zhengzhou Xinzheng Airport railway station, a railway station serving Zhengzhou Xinzheng International Airport

Beijing
 Terminal 2 station (Beijing Subway), a rapid transit station serving Terminal 1 and Terminal 2 of Beijing Capital International Airport
 Terminal 3 station (Beijing Subway), a rapid transit station serving Terminal 3 of Beijing Capital International Airport
 Daxing Airport station, a rapid transit and railway station serving Beijing Daxing International Airport

Chengdu
 Shuangliu International Airport Terminal 1 station, a rapid transit station serving Chengdu Shuangliu International Airport Terminal 1
 Shuangliu International Airport Terminal 2 station, a rapid transit station serving Chengdu Shuangliu International Airport Terminal 2
 Shuangliu Airport railway station, a high-speed rail station serving Chengdu Shuangliu International Airport
 Terminal 1 & 2 of Tianfu International Airport station, a rapid transit station serving Chengdu Tianfu International Airport Terminal 1 and Terminal 2

Guangzhou
 Airport South station (Guangzhou Metro), a rapid transit station serving Guangzhou Baiyun International Airport Terminal 1
 Airport North station (Guangzhou Metro), a rapid transit station serving Guangzhou Baiyun International Airport Terminal 2
 Baiyun Airport North railway station, a railway station serving Guangzhou Baiyun International Airport

Shanghai
 Hongqiao Airport Terminal 1 station, a rapid transit station serving Shanghai Hongqiao International Airport Terminal 1
 Hongqiao Airport Terminal 2 station, a rapid transit station serving Shanghai Hongqiao International Airport Terminal 2
 Shanghai Hongqiao railway station, a high-speed rail station at Shanghai Hongqiao International Airport Terminal 2
 Pudong International Airport station, a metro and maglev station serving Shanghai Pudong International Airport

India
Chennai Chennai International Airport metro station, a rapid transit station
Delhi Delhi Airport metro station, a rapid transit station serving Indira Gandhi International Airport
Delhi Terminal 1-IGI Airport metro station, a rapid transit station serving Indira Gandhi International Airport
Lucknow Chaudhary Charan Singh International Airport metro station, an under-construction metro station
Mumbai CSIA T1 metro station andCSIA T2 metro station, a pair of under-construction metro stations serving Chatrapati Shivaji International Airport

Nagpur
 Airport South metro station (Nagpur), a rapid transit station serving Dr. Babasaheb Ambedkar International Airport
 Airport metro station (Nagpur), a rapid transit station serving Dr. Babasaheb Ambedkar International Airport
 New Airport metro station, a rapid transit station serving Dr. Babasaheb Ambedkar International Airport

Japan 
Fukuoka Fukuokakūkō Station, a subway station serving Fukuoka Airport's domestic terminal
Hanamaki Hanamaki-Kūkō Station, a railway station serving Hanamaki Airport in Iwate
Kobe Kobe Airport Station, a transit station serving Kobe Airport
Nagoya Central Japan International Airport station, a railway station serving Chubu Centrair International Airport
Miyazaki Miyazaki Airport Station, a railway station serving Miyazaki Airport
Osaka Kansai Airport Station, a railway station serving Kansai International Airport
Osaka Osaka Airport Station, a monorail station serving Itami Airport (Osaka International Airport)
Sapporo New Chitose Airport Station, a railway station serving New Chitose Airport
Sendai Sendai Airport Station, a railway station serving Sendai Airport

Tokyo
 Haneda Airport Terminal 1 Station, a monorail station serving Tokyo International Airport Terminal 1
 Haneda Airport Terminal 2 Station, a monorail station serving Tokyo International Airport Terminal 1
 Haneda Airport Terminal 1·2 Station, a railway station serving Tokyo International Airport Terminal 1 and Terminal 2
 Haneda Airport Terminal 3 Station, a railway station serving Tokyo International Airport Terminal 3
 Narita Airport Terminal 1 Station, a railway station serving Narita International Airport Terminal 1
 Narita Airport Terminal 2·3 Station, an underground railway station serving Narita International Airport Terminal 2 and Terminal 3

Macau
Taipa Airport station Macau, a light rapid transit station serving Macau International Airport

Singapore 

 Changi Airport MRT station, a mass rapid transit station connecting Changi Airport to the national mass rapid transit system

South Korea
Gwangju Airport station (Gwangju), a station serving Gwangju Airport

Turkey
İzmir Adnan Menderes Airport railway station, a regional railway station serving Adnan Menderes Airport

Europe 
Athens Athens Airport Station, a metro and suburban rail station in Tsalmeza, Greece, serving Athens International Airport
Helsinki Helsinki Airport station, a commuter rail station in Vantaa, Finland
Moscow Aeroport (Moscow Metro), a rapid transit station serving Khodynka Aerodrome

Denmark
Aalborg Aalborg Airport station, a railway station serving Aalborg Airport
Copenhagen Copenhagen Airport station, a railway station serving Copenhagen Airport
Copenhagen Lufthavnen station, a rapid transit station serving Copenhagen Airport

France
Paris Aéroport Charles de Gaulle 1 (Paris RER), a regional rail station in Tremblay-en-France
Paris Aéroport Charles de Gaulle 2 TGV, a high speed rail station in Tremblay-en-France
Toulouse Airport station, a tram stop serving Toulouse–Blagnac Airport

Germany
Berlin BER Airport – Terminal 1-2 station, a railway station serving Berlin Brandenburg Airport Terminal 1 and Terminal 2
Berlin BER Airport – Terminal 5 station, a railway station serving Berlin Brandenburg Airport Terminal 5
Cologne Cologne/Bonn Airport station, a high-speed rail station serving Cologne Bonn Airport
Dresden Dresden Flughafen station, a railway station serving Dresden Airport
Duesseldorf Düsseldorf Airport station, a railway station serving Düsseldorf Airport
Duesseldorf Düsseldorf Airport Terminal station, a railway station serving Düsseldorf Airport
Frankfurt am Main Frankfurt Airport regional station, a railway station serving Frankfurt Airport
Frankfurt am Main Frankfurt Airport long-distance station, a high-speed rail station serving Frankfurt Airport
Leipzig Leipzig/Halle Airport station, a high-speed rail station serving Leipzig/Halle Airport
Munich Munich Airport Terminal station, a railway station serving Munich Airport
Stuttgart Stuttgart Flughafen/Messe station, a railway station serving Stuttgart Airport

Spain
Barcelona Airport T1 (Barcelona Metro), a rapid transit station serving Josep Tarradellas Barcelona–El Prat Airport Terminal 1
Barcelona Airport T2 station, a metro and railway station serving Barcelona–El Prat Airport Terminal 2
Jerez de la Frontera Jerez Airport station, a railway station serving Jerez Airport
Madrid Aeropuerto T1-T2-T3 (Madrid Metro), a rapid transit station serving Madrid-Barajas Airport Terminal 1, Terminal 2 and Terminal 3
Madrid Aeropuerto T4 (Madrid Metro), a metro and railway station serving Adolfo Suárez Madrid–Barajas Airport Terminal 4
Málaga Aeropuerto station, a railway station serving Malaga Málaga Airport
Valencia Aeroport (Metrovalencia), a rapid transit station serving Valencia Airport

Switzerland
Geneva Geneva Airport railway station, a railway station serving Geneva Airport
Zurich Zürich Airport railway station, a railway station serving Zurich Airport
Zurich Zürich Flughafen, Bahnhof, a tram stop serving Zurich Airport

United Kingdom
London Gatwick Airport railway station, a railway station serving London Gatwick Airport
London London City Airport DLR station, a light metro station serving London City Airport
Newcastle upon Tyne Newcastle Airport Metro station, a rapid transit station serving Newcastle International Airport

North America

Canada 
Dorval, Quebec YUL–Montréal–Trudeau Airport station, a future light rail station serving Montréal–Trudeau International Airport
Mississauga, Ontario Toronto Pearson Terminal 1 station, a rail station serving Toronto Pearson International Airport
Ottawa, Ontario Airport station (Ottawa), a future light rail station serving Ottawa Macdonald–Cartier International Airport
Richmond, British Columbia Airport station (TransLink), a former bus rapid transit station serving Vancouver International Airport
Richmond, British Columbia YVR–Airport station, a light rapid transit station serving Vancouver International Airport

United States
Atlanta, Georgia Airport station (MARTA), a rapid transit station serving Hartsfield–Jackson Atlanta International Airport
Boston, Massachusetts Airport station (MBTA), a rapid transit station serving Logan International Airport
Baltimore, Maryland BWI Marshall Airport station, a light rail station serving Baltimore-Washington International Airport
Baltimore, Maryland BWI Rail Station, a regional and inter-city rail station at BWI
Chicago, Illinois Midway station (CTA), a rapid transit station serving Midway International Airport
Chicago, Illinois O'Hare station, a rapid transit station serving O'Hare International Airport
Cleveland, Ohio Airport station (GCRTA), a rapid transit station serving Cleveland Hopkins International Airport
Dallas/Fort Worth, Texas DFW Airport Terminal A station, a light rail station in Grapevine, Texas
Dallas/Fort Worth, Texas DFW Airport Terminal B station, a commuter rail station in Grapevine, Texas
Denver, Colorado Denver Airport station, a commuter rail station serving Denver International Airport
Islip, New York Ronkonkoma station (signed as Ronkonkoma L.I. MacArthur Airport), a commuter rail station in Ronkonkoma, New York, serving Long Island MacArthur Airport
Miami, Florida Miami Intermodal Center, a rapid transit station serving Miami International Airport
Minneapolis, Minnesota Terminal 1-Lindbergh station and Terminal 2-Humphrey station, light rail stations serving Minneapolis-Saint Paul International Airport
Oakland, California Oakland International Airport station, a light rapid transit station
Philadelphia, Pennsylvania Philadelphia International Airport stations, four regional rail stations
Portland, Oregon Portland International Airport MAX Station, a light rail station
Providence, Rhode Island T.F. Green Airport station, an MBTA Commuter Rail station serving T.F. Green Airport
St. Louis, Missouri Lambert Airport Terminal 1 station and Lambert Airport Terminal 2 station, light rail stations serving Lambert St. Louis International Airport
Salt Lake City, Utah Airport station (UTA), a light rail station serving Salt Lake City International Airport
San Francisco, California San Francisco International Airport station, a rapid transit station
Seattle, Washington SeaTac/Airport station, a light rail station serving Seattle-Tacoma International Airport
Washington, D.C. Ronald Reagan Washington National Airport Station, a rapid transit station

Oceania

Australia 
Brisbane, Queensland Domestic Terminal railway station, Brisbane
Brisbane, Queensland International Terminal railway station, Brisbane
Perth, Western Australia Airport Central railway station
Perth, Western Australia Redcliffe railway station
Sydney, New South Wales Domestic Airport railway station, Sydney
Sydney, New South Wales International Airport railway station, Sydney
Wollongong, New South Wales Albion Park railway station

See also
Airport station (disambiguation)
Airport rail link
:Category:Airport railway stations